Santa Claus and the Magic Drum (Original Finnish title: Joulupukki ja noitarumpu) is a 51 minute long Finnish-Hungarian animation released in 1996. The story is based on a 1995 children's book of the same name by Mauri Kunnas. The movie has been recorded in Finnish, English (British) and Swedish. It was made for TV broadcasting and was first shown on Christmas Eve 1996, and has been broadcast on YLE TV2 nearly every Christmas Eve since. Santa Claus and the Magic Drum has been sold to over 40 countries.

In addition to Mauri Kunnas and his wife Tarja Kunnas, the illustrator Sami Toivonen and the cartoonist Kari Korhonen participated in the designing of the animation. The animation work of the film was subcontracted to a Hungarian animation studio Funny Films, operating in Pécs, and involved 50 people.

Plot 
While reading his usual gift wish mail, Santa Claus stumbles upon an unusual letter which everyone assume to be a gift wish letter from a boy called Vekara. Santa Claus can not decide what kind of gift the letter, which is a child's drawing, asks for, so he and his two helpers Noora and Ville decide to go and show it to the master elf. At the same time odd things are happening around Santa's village, and strange accidents follow Santa. The peculiar events are traced back to a noaidi practicing shamanism with a powerful magic drum. At the end of the film the shaman explains that he sent the mysterious letter as a child, and the drawing is him dressed as an elf because he wanted to be Santa's little Christmas helper. By accident the letter was not delivered to Santa, and as years passed and Santa did not reply, Vekara became begrudged. After both sides of the story are told the situation is resolved, Santa grants Vekara his wish and makes him a helper elf, and all ends well.

Cast 
Finnish voice actors:

The theme music "Joulupukin töissä" was performed by J. Karjalainen and his band Electric Sauna.

Television broadcasts

See also
 List of Christmas films
 Santa Claus in film

References 

Santa Claus in film
Finnish television films
Finnish animated films
Christmas television specials
1996 television films
1996 animated films
1996 films
Yle original programming
Hungarian television films
Hungarian animated films